The term "versifier" may refer to:

 a poetaster
 the versificator regis, or "king's poet"